The Sigma 30mm F1.4 DC DN Contemporary lens is a fixed maximum aperture standard prime lens for Sony E, Micro Four-Thirds, Canon EF-M, and Leica L mounts, announced by Sigma in February 2016.

The lens is the mirrorless equivalent of the Sigma 30mm f/1.4 EX DC HSM, a similar lens of a different optical formula optimized for traditional mirror DSLRs.

Build quality
The lens showcases a matte black plastic exterior with the Sigma Contemporary "C" badge on the side of the lens. It features a large manual focus ring and a detachable barrel-type lens hood. The lens is the updated version of the Sigma 30mm F2.8 Art lens, including autofocus and improving upon overall image quality, sharpness, and a faster maximum aperture.

Image quality
The lens is exceptionally sharp, even when stopped down to its maximum aperture of f/1.4. The lens also excels in low-light photography given its fast maximum aperture of f/1.4, resulting in creamy smooth bokeh and thin depth‑of‑field.

The lens suffers from moderate barrel distortion and minor vignetting when at f/1.4 (which can be resolved by stopping down to f/2.8). Hints of chromatic aberration can be noted appearing in the corners of the frame when at f/1.4.

See also
 List of third-party E-mount lenses
 List of Micro Four Thirds lenses
 Zeiss Touit Planar T* 1.8/32mm

References

30
Camera lenses introduced in 2016
Sigma 30 1.4 DC